Move is a 2012 German comedy film directed by Dietrich Brüggemann.

The film revolves around eight friends in Berlin in their late twenties who try to find a perspective on their lives during constant moves between flat-shares and small part-time jobs. The focus is on siblings Philipp, Wiebke and Swantje. Philipp wants to be a photographer and has been in love with Dina for a long time, but she only sees him as a good friend. Dina shares a flat with Wiebke, who after endless internships finally lands a real job. Wiebke has her eye on Michael, who, however, only wants a "friendship-based" relationship. Philip's best friend Thomas does everything in his power to pursue a career as a graphic designer, and as a result he increasingly neglects his relationship with Jessica. Then there is Maria, who still lives in Freiburg, but is just waiting to finally move in with Philipp in Berlin. Meanwhile, Swantje lives in Stuttgart and maintains contact with the "metropolis" Berlin, mainly by phone.

Cast 
 Jacob Matschenz as Philipp
 Robert Gwisdek as Thomas
 Anna Brüggemann as Dina
 Alice Dwyer as Jessica
 Katharina Spiering as Wiebke
 Aylin Tezel as Maria
 Alexander Khuon as Michael
 Amelie Kiefer as Swantje
 Corinna Harfouch as Mutter
 Hans-Heinrich Hardt as Vater
 Leslie Malton as Mutter Dina
 Herbert Knaup as Vater Dina

External links 

  (in German)

2012 comedy films
2012 films
German comedy films
2010s German films